The 1924 Minnesota Golden Gophers football team represented the University of Minnesota in the 1924 Big Ten Conference football season. In their third year under head coach William H. Spaulding, the Golden Gophers compiled a 3–3–2 record and outscored their opponents by a combined score of 68 to 62. It was Minnesota's first season playing in Memorial Stadium.

Guard George Abramson and tackle Ted Cox were named All-Big Ten first team.

Total attendance for the season was 139,772, which averaged to 23,297.  The season high for attendance was against Illinois.

Schedule

Game summaries

Michigan

For its fifth game, Minnesota hosted Michigan in the first Big Ten Conference game played in the new horseshoe-shaped Memorial Stadium.  Michigan recovered a fumble in Minnesota territory, and William Herrnstein caught a 30-yard touchdown pass to give Michigan a 6–0 lead.  In the second quarter, Michigan scored again, as Ferdinand Rockwell ran around the end for a touchdown on a faked field goal attempt.  Rockwell also kicked the extra point, and Michigan won the game, 13–0.

References

Minnesota
Minnesota Golden Gophers football seasons
Minnesota Golden Gophers football